The 1924–25 Gold Cup was the 13th edition of the Gold Cup, a cup competition in Northern Irish football.

The tournament was won by Distillery for the third time, defeating Queen's Island 2–0 in the final replay at Celtic Park, after the previous final match ended in a 1–1 draw.

Results

First round

|}

Replays

|}

Quarter-finals

|}

Replay

|}

Second replay

|}

Semi-finals

|}

Replay

|}

Second replay

|}

Final

Replay

References

1924–25 in Northern Ireland association football